The Tritec engine (also known as Pentagon) is a four-cylinder petrol engine that was manufactured between 1999 and 2007 by Tritec Motors in Brazil and was used in various cars including Chrysler and Mini models.

Tritec Motors Ltda
In 1997, Chrysler Corporation and Rover Group (then a subsidiary of BMW) formed a joint venture called Tritec Motors to design a new small straight-4 engine. The new company built a factory in Campo Largo of Curitiba, Brazil specifically to manufacture the new engine. The Tritec name stands for the union of the three countries involved: Germany, the United Kingdom, and Brazil.

When BMW broke up the remains of Rover Group in 2000, BMW kept the stake in Tritec Motors as the engine was in use in the Mini range which BMW had retained. In 2007 BMW sold its 50% stake to DaimlerChrysler and cancelled its contract for the Tritec engine. BMW entered into a new joint venture with PSA Peugeot Citroen to develop the Prince engine which is used in the second generation Mini cars. 

The factory had a capacity of 400,000 engines a year,  and in 2006 production was around 200,000 engines. Production ceased in June 2007 following the ending of the joint venture.  

In March 2008 Fiat Powertrain Technologies bought the plant and licenses to produce Tritec engines at a cost of €83 million, and in 2010 subsequently launched its own E.torQ engine.

Engine details
It is a modern engine with an SOHC 16-valve head, electronic throttle control, and meets Euro IV emissions requirements. There are three versions of the engine,  and supercharged .

BMW complained about the performance of the engine. According to Ward's Auto, Erich Sonntag of BMW described the Tritec engine as old fashioned and not very effective on function, performance and fuel efficiency. This was no news to the Rover Group engineers on the MINI project, who had wanted to use Rover's K-Series engine, which had greater specific power output, better fuel efficiency, was built next door to the proposed MINI line at Longbridge, and already had amortised its R&D.

1.4 (T14a)
Like all Tritecs, it is an SOHC 16-valve cast iron engine with an aluminium cylinder head and multipoint sequential electronic fuel injection.

Applications:
Mini One (Portugal, Greece) (until 2008)

1.6 (T16b3)
The  version uses the same  bore with a longer  stroke.

Applications:
Chery A11 (Windcloud)
Chery A15 (Flagcloud)
Chrysler Neon (in non-US markets)
Chrysler PT Cruiser (in non-US markets)
Lifan 620
Lifan 520
Mini Hatch and Convertible (until 2008).

1.6 SC (T16b4)
The 1.6 SC uses an Eaton M45 Roots type supercharger with intercooler. The compression ratio is reduced from 10.5:1 to 8.3:1. The  SC won the "1.4 L to 1.8 L" category at the International Engine of the Year awards for 2003. It also won Ward's 10 Best Engines award for 2003.

Applications:
Mini Hatch Cooper S
2006 Dodge Hornet concept car

References

Fiat engines
Chrysler engines
BMW engines
Gasoline engines by model
1997 introductions
Joint ventures
Straight-four engines